Goniorhynchus plumbeizonalis is a moth in the family Crambidae. It was described by George Hampson in 1896. It is found in the Indian state of Meghalaya, Myanmar and Thailand.

References

Moths described in 1896
Spilomelinae